Nilantha Cooray (born 20 January 1978) is a Sri Lankan cricketer who now plays for the Maldives national cricket team. He played in 100 first-class matches and 72 List A matches in Sri Lanka between 1998 and 2012. He is also the national Level-3 coach of the Maldives.

In June 2019, he was named in the Maldives' squad for the 2019 Malaysia Tri-Nation Series tournament. He made his Twenty20 International (T20I) debut for the Maldives, against Malaysia, on 25 June 2019. He was named the Player of the Series, after scoring 101 runs and taking six wickets in the four matches he played.

References

External links
 

1978 births
Living people
Sportspeople from Moratuwa
Maldivian cricketers
Maldives Twenty20 International cricketers
Sri Lankan cricketers
Burgher Recreation Club cricketers
Moors Sports Club cricketers
Panadura Sports Club cricketers
Sebastianites Cricket and Athletic Club cricketers
Tamil Union Cricket and Athletic Club cricketers
Maldivian people of Sri Lankan descent